The Abraham Path is a cultural route believed to have been the path of the patriarch Abraham's ancient journey across the Ancient Near East. The path was established in 2007 as a pilgrims' way to mimic the historical believed route of Abraham, between his birthplace of Ur of the Chaldees, believed by some to have been Urfa, Turkey, and his final destination of the desert of Negev.

Abraham

Abraham/Ibrahim is believed to have lived in the Bronze Age. He traveled with family and flocks throughout the Fertile Crescent, the Arabian peninsula, and the Nile Valley. His story has inspired myriad communities including Kurds, Muslim, Jews, Christians, Alevi, Bedouin, Fellahin, Samaritans, and countless across the world. The Abraham Path Initiative aims to build on this narrative of shared connection with its rich tradition of walking and hospitality to strangers.

Modern reconstruction 
A reconstruction of the ancient path was created in 2007 by the Abraham Path Initiative, a registered 501(c)(3) nonprofit organization based in Cambridge, Massachusetts, United States, with a global network of partners. William Ury, negotiator and author of Getting to YES helped found the project at Harvard University's Program on Negotiation. Ury's TED Talk speaks about the beginnings of the path and the vision behind the initiative. Ury says that every culture has an origin-story, and that the origin-story of the Middle East is about how a man and his family walked the Middle East about four thousand years ago. The Abraham Path Initiative is endorsed by the United Nations World Tourism Organization, the United Nations Alliance of Civilizations and other international partners. The initiative is a non-profit, non-religious and non-political organization, whose mission is to support local partners in developing the Abraham Path as:
 a catalyst for socioeconomic development and sustainable tourism.
 a place of meeting and connection between people from the Middle East and people around the world.
 a creative space for stories that highlight the unique culture, heritage and hospitality of the region.

Overview of the current path 
The main historical Abrahamic sites on the current path are Urfa, the birthplace of Abraham according to some Muslim traditions; Harran, according to the Hebrew Bible, a town Abraham lived in, and from which he received the call to start the main part of his journey; Jerusalem, the scene for the binding of Isaac upon the Foundation Stone, according to the Hebrew Bible; and Hebron, the location of the tomb of Abraham and his wife Sarah, according to Jewish, Christian and Muslim traditions.

Major junctions
 Urfa
 Harran
 Nablus
 Jericho
 Jerusalem
 Bethlehem
 Hebron
 Negev

See also 
List of long-distance footpaths

References

Further reading 
 Feiler, Bruce (2005). Abraham: A Journey to the Heart of Three Faiths, William Morrow Paperbacks.
 Bonder, Nilton (2010). Taking Off Your Shoes: The Abraham Path, A Path to the Other, Trafford Publishing.

External links 
 
 "10 of the best new walking trails". National Geographic Traveller.
 "Monumental change". The Australian.
 "Echoes of an ancient land along Turkey's Abraham Path". BBC Travel
 "How to plan a trek along the Abraham Path". Lonely Planet
 "Back to the Beginning with Christiane Amanpour". ABC News
 Simmons, Gail (July 7, 2011). "Follow in the Footsteps of Abraham". Time.
 "In Search of An Alternative Palestine". Al Jazeera

Hiking trails in Asia
Hiking trails in Turkey
Hiking trails in Israel
Levant
Abraham
Cultural heritage